Sohray Ghazanfariyeh-ye Jonubi (also Romanized as Şoḩrāy Ghaẕanfarīyeh-ye Jonūbī) is a village in Dasht Rural District, in the Central District of Shahreza County, Isfahan Province, Iran. At the 2006 census, its population was 188, in 39 families.

References 

Populated places in Shahreza County